Nyapea, is a town in Zombo District, West Nile sub-region, in the Northern Region of Uganda.

Location

The coordinates of Nyapea are:2°27'31.0"N, 30°57'21.0"E (Latitude:2.458611; Longitude:30.955833).

Points of interest
The following points of interest are found within the town limits or close to its edges:

 The offices of Nyapea Town Council
 Nyapea Central Market: The largest fresh-produce market in the town.
 St. Aloysius College Nyapea: An all-boys residential middle and high school (grades 8-13).
 Holy Family Hospital Nyapea (Nyapea Hospital): A charitable community hospital operated by Todd Marshall Price, MD, an American physician, belonging to International Medical Outreach, of Houston, Texas, United States.
 The town of Nyapea is the location of Nyagak III Hydroelectric Power Station, a 6.6 megawatts small hydro-power plant under construction, as of March 2019.

See also

 Nyagak Hydroelectric Power Station

References

External links
 Zombo District Internet Portal

Populated places in Northern Region, Uganda
Cities in the Great Rift Valley
Zombo District
West Nile sub-region